Isabel Sánchez (born 28 November 1976) is a Spanish basketball player who competed in the 2008 Summer Olympics.

References

1976 births
Living people
Spanish women's basketball players
Olympic basketball players of Spain
Basketball players at the 2008 Summer Olympics
Mediterranean Games bronze medalists for Spain
Mediterranean Games medalists in basketball
Competitors at the 2001 Mediterranean Games